Limbo is a 2020 British comedy-drama film, directed by Ben Sharrock. The film centres on four asylum seekers who are staying on a remote island in Scotland, and taking cultural awareness classes, while awaiting the processing of their refugee claims.

The film was named as an Official Selection of the 2020 Cannes Film Festival, but was not screened due to the cancellation of the physical festival in light of the COVID-19 pandemic.
The film has gained positive reviews and has won several awards and nominations. Limbo garnered four nominations at the 2020 British Independent Film Awards (BIFAs) including Amir El-Masry Best Actor, Irune Gurtubai Breakthrough Producer, and Nick Cooke Best Cinematography, for which it won Breakthrough Producer. It has also been nominated for two British Academy Film Awards, including Outstanding British Film.

Plot 
An offbeat observation of the refugee experience. On a fictional remote Scottish island, a group of new arrivals await the results of their asylum claims. Among them is Omar, a young Syrian musician burdened by the weight of his grandfather's oud, which he has carried all the way from his homeland.

Cast
 Amir El-Masry as Omar
 Vikash Bhai as Farhad
 Ola Orebiyi as Wasef
 Kwabena Ansah as Abedi
 Kenneth Collard as Boris
 Kais Nashef as Nabil
 Sidse Babett Knudsen as Helga

Release
The film had its world premiere at the Toronto International Film Festival on 12 September 2020. Prior to, MUBI acquired U.K. and Irish distribution rights to the film. It was initially set to world premiere at the Cannes Film Festival in May 2020, prior to its cancellation due to the COVID-19 pandemic. In February 2021, Focus Features acquired U.S. distribution rights to the film. It was released in the United States on 30 April 2021, and the United Kingdom on 30 July 2021.

Reception 
On review aggregator Rotten Tomatoes, the film holds an approval rating of 93% based on 122 critic reviews, with an average rating of 7.9/10. The site's critical consensus reads, "A profoundly uplifting portrait of the refugee experience, Limbo is distinguished by its offbeat tone -- and overall impressive work from debuting director Ben Sharrock." Peter Bradshaw of The Guardian praised Limbos "elegant deadpan style established from the outset, Sharrock soon gets you to invest in the characters and care deeply about what happens to them. Limbo is about refugees and asylum seekers in Britain, and it's a bracingly internationalist and non-parochial piece of work: film-making with a bold view on the world but also as gentle and intimate as a much-loved sitcom... This is superlative film-making from Sharrock." It was given 4.5 stars out of 5 by Roger Egbert, stating that "Sharrock’s greatest feat here is using all these absurdist touches towards achieving a sensitive, reflective sort of humor".

Accolades

References

External links

2020 films
British comedy-drama films
Films set in Scotland
Films shot in Scotland
2020 comedy-drama films
Film4 Productions films
Focus Features films
2020s English-language films
2020s British films